Naas is a municipality in the district of Weiz in the Austrian state of Styria.

Organization

There are five cadastral communities (Katastralgemeinde): Affental, Birchbaum, Dürntal, Gschaid bei Weiz, and Naas.

References

Cities and towns in Weiz District